Rattling Brook is a local service district and designated place in the Canadian province of Newfoundland and Labrador. It is in the north-central portion of the island of Newfoundland near Baie Verte and Springdale. Formerly a fishing village, its main residents are retirees and seasonal tourists.

Geography 

Rattling Brook is in Newfoundland within Subdivision P of Division No. 8. The area in and around Rattling Brook is home to a diverse group of wildlife, both mammal and aquatic. During the summer months, species of fox, lynx and bear are not unusual. In the colder months, sealife observed in the bay area range from seals, humpback whales and several varieties of bird. The unique microclimate of the area provides shelter from harsher winds, guarded by the surrounding groups of cliff and rock formation enveloping the area.
Seals and other amphibious and aquatic life have been seen in and about the area.

Climate 
Rattling Brook has a humid continental climate (Köppen Dfb) with moderately warm summers and cold, snowy winters. For its latitude in Eastern Canada, Rattling Brook has highly moderated winters due to the proximity to the Atlantic Ocean.

Demographics 

Attractions 
The community has a park at the base of Rattling Brook Falls, a 140-metre waterfall beneath a natural rock formation.

Government 
Rattling Brook is a local service district (LSD) that is governed by a committee responsible for the provision of certain services to the community. The chair of the LSD committee is Jim Rowsell.

See also 
List of communities in Newfoundland and Labrador
List of designated places in Newfoundland and Labrador
List of local service districts in Newfoundland and Labrador

References 

Populated coastal places in Canada
Designated places in Newfoundland and Labrador
Local service districts in Newfoundland and Labrador